Beddome's day gecko (Cnemaspis beddomei) is a species of lizard in the family Gekkonidae. The species is endemic to India.

Etymology
C. beddomei is named after Richard Henry Beddome, 1830–1911, a British army officer and botanist.

Geographic range
C. beddomei is found in the Western Ghats, India. 

The type locality is "South Tinnevelly and Travankor hills 3-5000 feet" (914-1,524 meters).

Ecology
C. beddomei is diurnal and is found under rocks in forests; it feeds mainly on insects.

Reproduction
C. beddomei is oviparous.

Conservation status
The exact threats to C. beddomei are unknown but may be human disturbance. However, it exists in protected areas Kalakkad Mundanthurai Tiger Reserve and Meghamalai.

References

Further reading
Beddome RH (1870). "Descriptions of some new lizards from the Madras Presidency". Madras Monthly Journal of Medical Science 1: 30–35. (Gymnodactylus marmoratus, new species, p. 31).
Boulenger GA (1885). Catalogue of the Lizards in the British Museum (Natural History). Second Edition. Volume I. Geckonidæ, Eublepharidæ, Uroplatidæ, Pygopodidæ, Agamidæ. London: Trustees of the British Museum. (Taylor and Francis, printers). xii + 436 pp. + Plates I–XXXII. (Gonatodes marmoratus, p. 67 + Plate VI, figure 4).
Boulenger GA (1890). The Fauna of British India, Including Ceylon and Burma. Reptilia and Batrachia. London: Secretary of State for India in Council. (Taylor and Francis, printers). xviii + 541 pp. (Gonatodes marmoratus, p. 76).
Rösler H (2000). "Kommentierte Liste der rezent, subrezent und fossil bekannten Geckotaxa (Reptilia: Gekkonomorpha)". Gekkota 2: 28–153. (Cnemaspis beddomei, p. 62). (in German).
Smith MA (1935). The Fauna of British India, Including Ceylon and Burma. Reptilia and Amphibia. Vol. II.—Sauria. London: Secretary of State for India in Council. (Taylor and Francis, printers). xiii + 440 pp. + Plate I + 2 maps. (Cnemaspis beddomei, p. 71).
Theobald W (1876). Descriptive Catalogue of the Reptiles of British India. Calcutta: Thacker, Spink and Co. x + 238 pp. + Synopsis, i–xxxviii pp. + Appendix i–xiii pp. (Gymnodactylus beddomei, new species, pp. 88–89).

External links

Cnemaspis
Reptiles of India
Endemic fauna of the Western Ghats
Reptiles described in 1870